Little River (Wiyot: p'lèt kacamale "rocks-small" ) is a  westward-flowing stream in Mendocino County, California which empties into the Pacific Ocean in Van Damme State Park near the town of Little River, California.  Big River enters the Pacific about  farther north.

Tributaries include Laguna Creek, North Fork Little River, Two Log Creek, Russell Brook, and Rice Creek.

See also
List of rivers in California

References

Rivers of Mendocino County, California
Rivers of Northern California